Her TV (aTV4) is a television channel produced by Asia Television, which broadcast from December 31, 2007 until April 1, 2009.

History
His TV started test broadcasting on December 2, 2007 and official broadcasting on December 31, 2007. It could be watched only with a standard-definition television or better.  It closed on April 1, 2009, as Asia Television restructured their channels.

Program
Her TV mainly targeted a female audience, with such broadcasting as cosmic and fashion programs.  It co-operated with a famous model international company, Icon Models, as the digit icon of the channel.

See also
 His TV
 Plus TV

References 

Television stations in Hong Kong
Television channels and stations established in 2007